The Authentic Croatian Party of Rights ( or A-HSP) is a far right, and social conservative political party founded in Koprivnica, in 2005, after the merging of Croatian Rightists and Croatian Right Movement. The goal of the Movement is to unite all rightist parties in Croatia such as the HSP, the HSP 1861, the HČSP and others. It was very critical of the HSP's political positions until 2009.

A-HSP is pro-life and advocates protection of marriage as well as motherhood, children and youth, people of special needs and the nature. It is strongly against Croatian accession to EU and NATO and advocates irredentism of Bosnia, Herzegovina, Bay of Kotor, Syrmia and Bačka.

The party changed its name from United Supporters of the Croatian Party of Rights Movement to Autochthonous Croatian Party of Rights in 2009.

In 2010, the A-HSP publicly burned a copy of the Serb minority publication Novosti, whose HQ had to be protected by the police for a week.

In the 2013 European Parliament election, A-HSP received 2350 votes (0.32%) which was not enough to gain a seat.

In 2015, the Croatian Minister of the Interior, Ranko Ostojić, banned the party's rally at Zagreb's Ban Jelačić Square.

In 2017, the party organized a march through the Croatian capital in order to show their support and declare allegiance to then-recently elected American president Donald Trump. During the march, the party's members, dressed in black uniforms, were waving flags of the German neo-Nazi National Democratic Party and of the United States while shouting the Ustasha salute Za dom spremni. After the rally, the party's leader Dražen Keleminec was arrested by the police for disturbing the public peace and quiet. The Government of Croatia condemned the rally the same day for promoting Ustashism and Nazism. The following day, the U.S. embassy in Zagreb reacted by publishing a statement in which they strongly condemned the march and rejected any attempts to connect the U.S. with Ustasha ideology.

In April 2018, the leader of the party, Dražen Keleminec, was arrested near Jasenovac for disturbing public peace and quiet, and insulting police officers.

Electoral history

Legislative

European Parliament

References

External links
Official website 

Croatian nationalist parties
Nationalist parties in Croatia
Political parties established in 2005
Conservative parties in Croatia
2005 establishments in Croatia
Far-right politics in Croatia
Neo-Nazi political parties in Europe
Anti-Serbian sentiment